Two-time defending champion Roger Federer defeated James Blake in the final, 7–5, 6–3, 6–0 to win the men's singles tennis title at the 2006 Indian Wells Masters.

Seeds

All seeds receive a bye into the second round.

Draw

Finals

Top half

Section 1

Section 2

Section 3

Section 4

Bottom half

Section 5

Section 6

Section 7

Section 8

References

External links
 Main Draw (ATP)
 Qualifying Draw (ATP)
 ITF tournament profile

Men's Singles